The Sorcerer is one name for an enigmatic cave painting found in the cavern known as 'The Sanctuary' at the Cave of the Trois-Frères, Ariège, France, made around 13,000 BCE. The figure's significance is unknown, but it is usually interpreted as some kind of great spirit or master of animals. The unusual nature of The Sanctuary's decoration may also reflect the practice of magical ceremonies in the chamber. In his sketches of the cave art, Henri Breuil drew a horned humanoid torso and the publication of this drawing in the 1920s influenced many subsequent theories about the figure. However, Breuil's sketch has also come under criticism in recent years. A single prominent human figure is unusual in the cave paintings of the Upper Paleolithic, where the great majority of representations are of animals.

Breuil's drawing 
Henri Breuil asserted that the cave painting represented a shaman or magician — an interpretation which gives the image its name — and described the image he drew in these terms. Margaret Murray having seen the published drawing called Breuil's image 'the first depiction of a deity on Earth', an idea which Breuil and others later adopted.

His views held sway in the field for much of the 20th century, but they have since been largely superseded.

Breuil's image has been commonly interpreted as a shaman performing a ritual to ensure good hunting.

Critique
Certain modern scholars question the validity of Breuil's sketch, claiming that modern photographs do not show the famous antlers. Ronald Hutton theorized that Breuil was fitting the evidence to support his hunting-magic theory of cave-art, citing that "the figure drawn by Breuil is not the same as the one actually painted on the cave wall." Hutton's theory led him to conclude that reliance on Breuil's initial sketch resulted in many later scholars erroneously claiming that "The Sorcerer" was evidence that the concept of a Horned God dated back to Paleolithic times. 

Likewise, Peter Ucko concluded that inaccuracies in the drawing were caused by Breuil's working in dim gas-light, in awkward circumstances, and that he had mistaken cracks in the rock surface for man-made marks. However, this ignores the well-known fact that prehistoric art figures commonly use accidents in the material's surface (bumps, holes, cracks...) as part of their shape, in many occasions drawing only the lines needed to complete the figure; a technique reinforced with the optical effects brought by flickering fire light. 

Also, "the Sorcerer" is composed of both charcoal drawings and etching within the stone itself; details, such as etching, are often difficult to view from photographs due to their size and the quality of the light source. Particularly celebrated prehistorian Jean Clottes asserts that Breuil's sketch is accurate, saying "I have seen it myself perhaps 20 times over the years".

Continuing influence
The general assessment has placed the figure as central to an understanding of cave art: as S. G. F. Brandon expressed it in 1959, "it seems to be generally agreed that this picture of the 'Dancing Sorcerer' was a cult object of great significance to the community which used the cave."

Popular culture
Breuil's interpretation of the drawing as a shaman strongly influenced writer Pat Mills in the creation of the Lord Weird Slough Feg, a sorcerer, god, and early antagonist of the ongoing comic book title Slaine.

The novel The Story of B by Daniel Quinn includes an interpretation of the painting as an expression of late Paleolithic animism, a symbol for the human sense of identity with other animal life.

The 7th installment of the children's book series Magic Tree House, Sunset of the Sabertooth, The Sorcerer is depicted as a shaman-like traveller who rescues the protagonists, Jack and Annie, and helps take them home.

See also
Reindeer in Siberian shamanism
Shamanism

References

External links
Photograph of 'The Sorcerer' (courtesy of Britannica Online)
Sketch of 'The Sorcerer' by Breuil

1920s archaeological discoveries
Art of the Upper Paleolithic
Anthropomorphism
Rock art in France
Cave paintings